Igor Begelman is a virtuoso clarinet player. He has performed solos with a number of orchestras. He also plays chamber music, and is a member of the TAGI ensemble (formerly known as the New York Lyric Chamber Players).

Discography
 20th Century Russian Chamber Music / 8th Tucson Winter Chamber Music Festival
 Kupferman: Moon Music 2000 on Soundspells
 Here of Amazing Most Now on Albany Records

Awards
 2000 Avery Fisher Career Grant
 1994 Grace Woodson Memorial Award
 Second prize at the first Carl Nielsen International Clarinet Competition in 1997
 2010 BRIO award

References

Clarinetists
Living people
Year of birth missing (living people)
Place of birth missing (living people)
Juilliard School alumni
21st-century clarinetists